Lot Victor Diffey (21 March 1877 – 23 February 1952) was an Australian politician.

He was born in Tarrawingee to farmer Dan Diffey and Hannah Dunkley. He became a farmer at Everton and on 9 November 1903 married Jessie Catherine Mitchell, with whom he had five children; he would later marry Eveline May Hunt around 1949. He served on Beechworth Shire Council from 1909 to 1936 (president 1913–14) and Wangaratta Shire Council from 1926 to 1941 (president 1935–36). A founding member of the Country Party who served on its council from 1919 to 1924, he was elected to the Victorian Legislative Assembly in 1929 for Wangaratta and Ovens. He served until his retirement in 1945. In 1950 Diffey moved to Cheltenham, and he died in Brighton in 1952.

References

1877 births
1952 deaths
National Party of Australia members of the Parliament of Victoria
Members of the Victorian Legislative Assembly